Our Lady of Mount Carmel is a Roman Catholic church located at 128 Gove Street in East Boston, Massachusetts.

History
The church was built in 1905 and was a focal point of the local Italian American community until it was ordered shut down by the Roman Catholic Archdiocese of Boston in late 2004.

On October 10, 2004, as the final mass was celebrated, parishioners claimed that a statue of the Virgin Mary fell to the ground from its perch in front of the altar. Some proclaimed that this was a sign.

At first, the church was occupied by parishioners day and night, marking the longest such occupation in the history of the Roman Catholic Church in United States.

Today, after appeals to the decision through the courts and the Vatican, attempts have been unsuccessful and the waning enthusiasm and aging of the occupiers has left the church empty, except for Sunday Mass and occasional prayer services.

Parish school
East Boston Central Catholic School, on the Most Holy Redeemer Parish site, is the Catholic K1-8 school designated for this parish. The school is managed by a board from the Our Lady of the Assumption, Our Lady of Mount Carmel, Most Holy Redeemer and Sacred Heart parishes.

References

External links
 Official website

Roman Catholic churches completed in 1905
Roman Catholic churches in Boston
East Boston
1905 establishments in Massachusetts
20th-century Roman Catholic church buildings in the United States